

Friedrich-August Weinknecht (5 October 1895  – 26 October 1964) was a general in the Wehrmacht of Nazi Germany during World War II who commanded several infantry divisions. He was a recipient of the Knight's Cross of the Iron Cross.  Weinknecht surrendered to the Red Army  in August 1944 during Soviet Jassy–Kishinev Offensive.

Awards and decorations

 Knight's Cross of the Iron Cross on 15 July 1944 as Generalmajor and commander of 79. Infanterie-Division

References

Citations

Bibliography

 

1895 births
1964 deaths
Military personnel from Wrocław
Lieutenant generals of the German Army (Wehrmacht)
German Army personnel of World War I
Recipients of the Knight's Cross of the Iron Cross
German prisoners of war in World War II held by the Soviet Union
People from the Province of Silesia
Recipients of the clasp to the Iron Cross, 1st class
German Army generals of World War II